The Hospitality Industry and Allied Workers' Union (HIAWU) is a trade union representing workers in the hospitality sector in South Africa.

The union was founded in 1928, as the Natal Liquor and Catering Trade Employees' Union.  It affiliated to the South African Trades and Labour Council and grew slowly, reaching members by 1947.

By 1962, the union had grown to 4,328 members, and was affiliated to the Trade Union Council of South Africa.  The vast majority of members were classified as "coloured" or "Indian", although a handful were white.  In 1980, it was permitted to accept black workers as members.

In 1986, the union was a founding affiliate of the National Council of Trade Unions.  The federation encouraged it to merge with the rival HOTELICCA union, while it also discussed a possible merger with the Hotel and Restaurant Workers' Union.  Ultimately, it instead remained independent, renaming itself as the "Hospitality Industries and Allied Workers' Union", and affiliated to the Federation of Unions of South Africa.

References

Hospitality industry trade unions
Trade unions established in 1928
Trade unions in South Africa